Hakim Almasmari is a Yemeni American publisher and editor in chief of Yemen Post newspaper. He played leading roles in brokering tens of political mediation's in Yemen including the 2009 Saudi war with Houthis. He is a university lecturer in the field of international media and also studied business and law. For years, his work has appeared in some of the world's top media outlets, including The Wall Street Journal, Washington Post, The Guardian, The National, USA Today among others. Almasmari was born and raised in Michigan, United States. He is considered one of top reporters in Yemen and for over decade was a Yemen reporter for CNN and contributor as “Yemen expert” to Al Jazeera.

References

Living people
American newspaper journalists
Year of birth missing (living people)
American newspaper publishers (people)
American people of Yemeni descent
Journalists from Michigan